Tiansheng is a town under the administration of Xuanhan County in eastern Sichuan, China. , it administers the following two residential neighborhoods and ten villages:
Neighborhoods
Xianqiao Community
Donggong Community

Villages
Tiansheng Village
Dalugou Village
Jinbu Village
Youshi Village
Xishan Village
Echeng Village
Xinya Village
Mati Village
Minzhu Village
Taba Village

References 

Towns in Sichuan
Xuanhan County